Itawamba may refer to one of the following:
Levi Colbert, a Chickasaw leader who was called Itte-wamba Mingo, meaning bench chief.
Itawamba County, Mississippi
Itawamba Community College
Itawamba County School District
2010 Itawamba County School District prom controversy
Fulton-Itawamba County Airport